Several Native American tribes within the United States register motor vehicles and issue license plates to those vehicles.

The legal status of these plates varies by tribe, with some being recognized by the federal government and others not. Some nations issue plates for both tribal and personal vehicles, while others issue plates only for official tribal vehicles.

Some nations' plates indicate the U.S. state with which they are most closely associated, while others do not. This variation may even exist among the nations associated with one particular state.

Federally recognized tribes may also lease vehicles through the U.S. General Services Administration under certain circumstances. Such vehicles carry U.S. government license plates.

Alaska
Chickaloon: legal status unknown
Gold Creek-Susitna: legal status unknown

Maine
 Wabanaki Confederacy (Issued by the state)

Michigan
Keweenaw Bay Indian Community
Bay Mills Indian Community

Minnesota
Red Lake Indian Reservation
White Earth Indian Reservation
Fond du Lac Band of Lake Superior Chippewa
Grand Portage Band of Lake Superior Chippewa
Leech Lake Band of Ojibwe

North Dakota

Spirit Lake Tribe
Three Affiliated Tribes
Turtle Mountain Band of Chippewa

Oklahoma

Absentee-Shawnee Tribe of Indians of Oklahoma
Apache Tribe of Oklahoma
Caddo Nation of Oklahoma
Cherokee Nation
Cheyenne and Arapaho Tribes
Chickasaw Nation
Choctaw Nation of Oklahoma
Citizen Potawatomi Nation
Comanche Nation
Delaware Nation
Eastern Shawnee Tribe of Oklahoma
Iowa Tribe of Oklahoma
Kaw Nation
Kickapoo Tribe of Oklahoma
Kiowa Indian Tribe of Oklahoma
Miami Tribe of Oklahoma
Modoc Tribe of Oklahoma
Muscogee Creek Nation
Osage Nation
Ottawa Tribe of Oklahoma
Otoe-Missouria Tribe of Indians
Pawnee Nation of Oklahoma
Peoria Tribe of Indians of Oklahoma
Ponca Tribe of Indians of Oklahoma
Quapaw Tribe of Indians
Sac and Fox Nation
Shawnee Tribe
Seminole Nation of Oklahoma
Seneca-Cayuga Tribe of Oklahoma
United Keetoowah Band of Cherokee Indians in Oklahoma
Wichita and Affiliated Tribes (Wichita, Keechi, Waco & Tawakonie)
Wyandotte Nation

South Dakota
All tribal plates in South Dakota are issued by the state.  There are nine tribes recognized.  All nine have non-graphic, tax exempt plates beginning with a tribe-specific prefix, for use on official vehicles.  Seven of the nine tribes also have graphic plates available for private vehicles.  The graphic plates are available to all South Dakota residents (no tribal affiliation is required.)
Cheyenne River Lakota: official vehicles only; South Dakota Exempt plates with "CRT" prefix.
Crow Creek Dakota
Lower Brule Lakota
Flandreau Santee Dakota
Oglala Lakota: official vehicles only; South Dakota Exempt plates with "OST" prefix.
Rosebud Lakota
Sisseton Wahpeton Dakota
Standing Rock Dakota & Lakota
Yankton Dakota

Washington

Official, tribally owned vehicles bearing plates issued by tribes are allowed to use public roads under Washington state law. The Yakama tribe began issuing plates to all members in 2011.
Puyallup
Colville
Lummi
Muckleshoot
Quinault Indian Nation
Spokane Tribe
Tulalip Tribes
Yakama Nation

Wisconsin

Wisconsin Department of Transportation has reciprocal recognition of vehicle registration with the indicated Tribal organizations. It allows for unrestricted use and operations of vehicles registered with either the State of Wisconsin or the Tribal jurisdictions as per Wisconsin Statutes Section 341.409.  
Bad River Band of the Lake Superior Tribe of Chippewa Indians 
Lac Courte Oreilles Band of Lake Superior Chippewa Indians
Lac du Flambeau Band of Lake Superior Chippewa
Menominee Indian Tribe of Wisconsin
Oneida Indian Tribe of Wisconsin, with variations for different clans
Red Cliff Band of Lake Superior Chippewa

References

External links

Indian tribes
Native American law
American Indian reservations